The 2016 Korean Basketball League rookie draft (Korean: 2015 KBL 국내신인선수 드래프트) was held on October 18, 2016, at the Jamsil Students' Gymnasium in Seoul, South Korea. Of the 38 candidates, 26 were drafted, making this draft one of the few years with such a high draft rate. It was also one of the rare drafts which continued until the fourth round.

Draft selections
This table only shows the first twenty picks.

Notes

See also
Korean Basketball League draft

References

External links
 Draft: 2016 KBL Domestic Player draft results / 드래프트: 2016 KBL 국내신인선수 드래프트 결과 — Korean Basketball League official website 

Korean Basketball League draft
Korean Basketball League draft
2010s in Seoul
Korean Basketball League draft
Sport in Seoul
Events in Seoul